Robert Reichert (born August 11, 1948) is an American Democratic politician and former mayor of Macon, Georgia, the fourth largest city in the state.

Early life and education
Reichert was born in Macon to Albert Reichert, Sr. He graduated from Stratford Academy in Macon in 1966 and thereafter enrolled at the University of Georgia at Athens. He left the university in 1968 and entered the United States Army.

In 1976 he returned to the University of Georgia and received a Bachelor of Science degree in agriculture and biology. In 1981, he obtained his Juris Doctor degree from the Mercer University Walter F. George School of Law in Macon.

Military record
From 1970 to 1971, he served with the 1st Air Cavalry Division as a helicopter pilot in South Vietnam. He attained the rank of chief warrant officer and completed his service in the armed forces as a member of the 3rd Armored Division at Fort Hood in central Texas.

Career
Reichert returned to Macon after his tour in the Vietnam War. On his discharge from the military, Reichert worked for a Macon automobile dealer. He interned under former U.S. Senator Sam Nunn, another Georgia Democrat.

Reichert then joined the Macon firm of Anderson, Walker and Reichert as an associate attorney. In 1985, he became a full partner and has been practicing law in the area of civil litigation. He previously served on the Macon City Council from 1987 to 1992.

Political career
In 1992, Reichert was elected to the Georgia House (District 126) from northwest Macon and Bibb County. He served a full decade but did not seek re-election in 2002. In the House, he served on the Industry Committee, the Judiciary Committee, and the Regulated Beverage Committee.

Reichert returned to politics when he ran in the Democratic primary for the Macon mayoralty.  He won the nomination, and then won the November 6, 2007, mayoral election with 96 percent of the vote. The vote was 11,488 to 461 for the Republican candidate, David Cousino. In this heavily Democratic city, the general election is considered merely a pro forma contest.

In June 2013, Reichert was one of six mayoral candidates for the consolidated government of Macon-Bibb. On October 15, 2013, Reichert won a runoff election against C. Jack Ellis with 63.1% of the vote, becoming the first mayor of the consolidated city-county.

On March 19, 2015, Reichert announced that he would seek a second full term as mayor of Macon-Bibb. He went on to win the election uncontested, as his challenger, local pastor and attorney Lonzy Edwards, suspended his campaign due to health concerns on April 19, 2016, and died 10 days later.

In November 2020, Reichert vetoed an anti-discrimination ordinance for all Macon residents who are LGBTQIA+. The ordinance had received the majority of the vote from residents and a 5-4 vote by the Macon-Bibb Commission. In an official statement from the Mayor's office, Reichert stated that "after prayerful consideration" he would be vetoing the legislation. He also attributed his decision in part to the timing of the bill so late in the term. Opponents of the bill focused on how they felt the issue of enacting legislation to protect LGBTQ+ people went against their rights to their religious beliefs.
“In fact, this ordinance takes away the business owners’ freedom to practice religion, and instead coerces many Christian and Jewish faith-based people in our county to accept the LGBTQ lifestyle as one of their moral beliefs,” said former mayoral candidate Blake Sullivan. Reichert stated the apprehension of the commissioners to amend the bill to address religious freedom concerns also attributed to his decision.  Supporters of the bill, including many local attorneys urged him to sign it, claiming that Reichert had not referenced any specific legal concerns.

Personal life
Reichert has been active in various civic organizations, including Leadership Macon, the Boy Scouts of America, the Macon Rescue Mission, the Georgia Industrial Home, Douglass Theatre, and the Kiwanis Club. Reichert and his wife, Dele, have two children, and they are members of the Vineville United Methodist Church.

See also
 Timeline of Macon, Georgia

References

Website of the Mayor's Office

1948 births
Living people
University of Georgia alumni
United States Army aviators
United States Army personnel of the Vietnam War
Georgia (U.S. state) lawyers
Methodists from Georgia (U.S. state)
Military personnel from Georgia (U.S. state)
Aviators from Georgia (U.S. state)
Mayors of Macon, Georgia
Democratic Party members of the Georgia House of Representatives
Mercer University alumni
21st-century American politicians
20th-century Methodists
21st-century Methodists
American United Methodists
United States Army officers